The Night of Agony was a historical event in the Brazilian Empire, occurring in the pre-dawn hours of 12 November 1823, when emperor Dom Pedro I ordered the army to invade and dissolve the . The assembly resisted for several hours, but in the end was dissolved and a few of its members were imprisoned and deported, including the brothers José Bonifácio de Andrada e Silva, Martim Francisco Ribeiro de Andrada and Antônio Carlos Ribeiro de Andrada.

The following year, on 25 March 1824, a new Imperial Constitution was adopted, which designed an Executive, Legislative, and Judicial powers, but also a Moderating power, which invested in the Emperor the title of "Moderator", acting as a neutral intermediary between the branches.

References

Constitution of Brazil
Legal history of Brazil
1823 in Brazil
1823 in law
November 1823 events